List of freshwater fish of Russia includes species of freshwater fish found in Russian Federation, and includes those introduced.

Acipenseriformes

Acipenseridae (Sturgeons) 
 Acipenser
 Acipenser baerii — Siberian sturgeon
 Acipenser gueldenstaedtii — Russian sturgeon
 Acipenser mikadoi  — Sakhalin sturgeon
 Acipenser nudiventris — Fringebarbel sturgeon
 Acipenser persicus — Persian sturgeon
 Acipenser ruthenus — Sterlet
 Acipenser schrenckii — Japanese sturgeon
 Acipenser stellatus — Starry sturgeon
 Acipenser sturio — European sea sturgeon
 Huso
 Huso dauricus — Kaluga sturgeon
 Huso huso — Beluga sturgeon

Polyodontidae (Paddlefishes) 
 Polyodon
 Polyodon spathula — American paddlefish; North American species, acclimatized

Clupeiformes

Clupeidae (Herring, shads, sardines, and menhadens)) 
 Alosa (River herrings)
 Alosa alosa — Allis shad 
 Alosa caspia — Caspian shad 
 Alosa immaculata — Pontic shad 
 Alosa kessleri — Caspian anadromous shad
 Clupeonella
 Clupeonella abrau — Abrau sprat
 Clupeonella cultriventris — Black Sea sprat

Salmoniformes

Salmonidae

Subfamily Salmoninae 
 Brachymystax (Lenoks)
 Brachymystax lenok — Sharp-snouted lenok
 Brachymystax tumensis — Blunt-snouted lenok
 Hucho
 Hucho perryi — Japanese huchen, Sakhalin taimen
 Hucho taimen — Taimen
 Oncorhynchus (Pacific salmon and Pacific trout)
 Oncorhynchus gorbuscha — Pink salmon, humpback salmon
 Oncorhynchus keta — Chum salmon, dog salmon, keta salmon, silverbrite salmon
 Oncorhynchus kisutch — Coho salmon, silver salmon, silvers
 Oncorhynchus masou — masu salmon, cherry salmon, Japanese salmon, seema
 Oncorhynchus mykiss — Rainbow trout
 Oncorhynchus nerka — Sockeye salmon, red salmon, blueback salmon, kokanee
 Oncorhynchus tshawytscha — Chinook salmon
 Salmo
 Salmo ezenami — Kezenoi-am trout
 Salmo labrax — Black Sea salmon
 Salmo salar — Atlantic salmon
 Salmo trutta — Brown trout
 Salvelinus (Char)
 Salvelinus albus — White char 
 Salvelinus alpinus — Arctic char
 Salvelinus boganidae — Boganida char 
 Salvelinus czerskii — Cherskii's char 
 Salvelinus drjagini — Dryagin's char 
 Salvelinus elgyticus — Small-mouth char 
 Salvelinus jacuticus — Yakutian char 
 Salvelinus kronocius 
 Salvelinus lepechini 
 Salvelinus leucomaenis — Whitespotted char
 Salvelinus levanidovi 
 Salvelinus malma — Dolly Varden trout 
 Salvelinus neiva — Neiva 
 Salvelinus schmidti 
 Salvelinus taimyricus 
 Salvelinus taranetzi — Taranets char 
 Salvelinus tolmachoffi — Lake Yessey char 
 Salvethymus
 Salvethymus svetovidovi — Long-finned charr

Subfamily Coregoninae 
 Coregonus (Whitefishes)
 Coregonus albula — Vendace
 Coregonus autumnalis — Arctic cisco
 Coregonus baicalensis 
 Coregonus chadary — Khadary whitefish 
 Coregonus laurettae — Bering cisco 
 Coregonus lavaretus — common whitefish, European whitefish; lavaret 
 Coregonus migratorius — Omul
 Coregonus muksun — Muksun
 Coregonus nasus — Broad whitefish
 Coregonus peled — Peled
 Coregonus sardinella — Sardine cisco
 Coregonus tugun  — Tugun
 Coregonus ussuriensis — Amur whitefish 
 Prosopium
 Prosopium coulterii — Pygmy whitefish 
 Prosopium cylindraceum — Round whitefish
 Stenodus
 Stenodus leucichthys — Beloribitsa
 Stenodus nelma — Nelma, sheefish or inconnu

Subfamily Thymallinae 
 Thymallus  (Graylings)
 Thymallus arcticus — Arctic grayling 
 Thymallus baicalensis — Baikal black grayling 
 Thymallus brevipinnis — Baikal white grayling 
 Thymallus brevirostris — Mongolian grayling 
 Thymallus burejensis 
 Thymallus flavomaculatus — Yellow-spotted grayling 
 Thymallus grubii — Amur grayling 
 Thymallus mertensii 
 Thymallus pallasii — East Siberian grayling 
 Thymallus svetovidovi — Upper Yenisei grayling 
 Thymallus thymallus — Grayling 
 Thymallus tugarinae — Lower Amur grayling

Osmeriformes

Osmeridae (Freshwater smelts, typical smelts) 
 Hypomesus
 Hypomesus japonicus 
 Hypomesus nipponensis — Japanese smelt 
 Hypomesus olidus — Pond smelt 
 Osmerus
 Osmerus eperlanus — European smelt
 Osmerus mordax — Rainbow smelt

Esociformes

Esocidae (Pikes) 
 Esox
 Esox lucius — Northern pike
 Esox reichertii — Amur pike

Umbridae (Mudminnows) 
 Dallia
 Dallia admirabilis 
 Dallia delicatissima
 Dallia pectoralis — Alaska blackfish

Anguilliformes

Anguillidae (Freshwater eels) 
 Anguilla
 Anguilla anguilla — European eel

Cypriniformes

Cyprinidae 
 Abbottina (False gudgeons)
 Abbottina rivularis — Chinese false gudgeon 
 Abramis 
 Abramis brama — Common bream
 Acanthorhodeus (Spiny bitterlings)
 Acanthorhodeus chankaensis — Khanka spiny bitterling 
 Acheilognathus (Bitterlings)
 Acheilognathus asmussii — Russian bitterling 
 Alburnoides (Bleaks)
 Alburnoides bipunctatus — Schneider, spirlin, bleak, riffle minnow
 Alburnus (Bleaks)
 Alburnus alburnus — Common bleak
 Alburnus chalcoides — Danube bleak or Caspian shemaya 
 Aphyocypris
 Aphyocypris chinensis — Chinese bleak 
 Aspius
 Aspius aspius — Asp
 Ballerus (Breams)
 Ballerus ballerus — Zope, blue bream
 Ballerus sapa — White-eye bream
 Barbus (Typical barbels and barbs)
 Barbus barbus — Common barbel
 Barbus ciscaucasicus — Terek barbel 
 Barbus tauricus — Crimean barbel
 Blicca
 Blicca bjoerkna — Silver bream
 Carassius
 Carassius carassius  — Crucian carp
 Carassius gibelio — Prussian carp
 Chanodichthys
 Chanodichthys dabryi — Humpback 
 Chanodichthys erythropterus — Predatory carp
 Chanodichthys mongolicus — Mongolian redfin 
 Chondrostoma (Nases)
 Chondrostoma colchicum — Colchic nase 
 Chondrostoma nasus — Common nase, sneep
 Chondrostoma oxyrhynchum — Terek nase 
 Chondrostoma variabile — Volga undermouth 
 Ctenopharyngodon
 Ctenopharyngodon idella — Grass carp, white amur
 Culter
 Culter alburnus 
 Cyprinus (Typical carps)
 Cyprinus carpio — Common carp
 Elopichthys
 Elopichthys bambusa — Yellowcheek or kanyu
 Gnathopogon
 Gnathopogon strigatus — Manchurian gudgeon 
 Gobio (Typical gudgeons)
 Gobio gobio — Gudgeon
 Gobio soldatovi — Soldatov's gudgeon 
 Gobiobotia
 Gobiobotia pappenheimi — Eightbarbel gudgeon 
 Hemibarbus
 Hemibarbus labeo — Barbel steed 
 Hemibarbus maculatus — Spotted steed 
 Hemiculter
 Hemiculter leucisculus — Sharpbelly 
 Hemiculter lucidus — Ussuri Sharpbelly 
 Hypophthalmichthys
 Hypophthalmichthys molitrix — Silver carp
 Hypophthalmichthys nobilis — Bighead carp; Chinese species, introduced into Amur River basin, acclimatized in European part of Russia 
 Ladislavia
 Ladislavia taczhanowskii — Taczanowski's gudgeon 
 Leucaspius
 Leucaspius delineatus — Sunbleak, belica, moderlieschen
 Leuciscus (Eurasian daces)
 Leuciscus danilewskii — Danilevskii's dace 
 Leuciscus idus — Ide
 Leuciscus leuciscus — Common dace
 Leuciscus waleckii — Amur ide 
 Luciobarbus 
 Luciobarbus brachycephalus — Aral barbel 
 Luciobarbus capito — Bulatmai barbel 
 Megalobrama
 Megalobrama terminalis — Black Amur bream
 Microphysogobio
 Microphysogobio tungtingensis — Long-nosed gudgeon 
 Mylopharyngodon
 Mylopharyngodon piceus — Black carp, black Chinese roach
 Ochetobius
 Ochetobius elongatus, introduced into Lake Khanka 
 Opsariichthys
 Opsariichthys uncirostris — Three-lips 
 Oreoleuciscus
 Oreoleuciscus humilis — Dwarf Altai osman 
 Oreoleuciscus potanini — Altai osman 
 Parabramis
 Parabramis pekinensis — White Amur bream 
 Pelecus
 Pelecus cultratus — Sichel, ziege, sabre carp, sabrefish
 Petroleuciscus 
 Petroleuciscus borysthenicus — Dnieper chub, Black Sea chub 
 Phoxinus
 Phoxinus phoxinus — Eurasian minnow 
 Plagiognathops
 Plagiognathops microlepis — Smallscale yellowfin
 Pseudaspius
 Pseudaspius leptocephalus — Redfin 
 Pseudorasbora
 Pseudorasbora parva — Stone moroko
 Rhodeus (Bitterlings)
 Rhodeus lighti — Light's bitterling
 Rhodeus sericeus — Amur bitterling
 Rhynchocypris
 Rhynchocypris czekanowskii — Czekanowski's minnow 
 Rhynchocypris lagowskii — Amur minnow 
 Rhynchocypris percnurus — Lake minnow 
 Romanogobio
 Romanogobio albipinnatus — White-finned gudgeon
 Romanogobio ciscaucasicus — North Caucasian long-barbelled gudgeon 
 Romanogobio pentatrichus — Kuban long-barbelled gudgeon 
 Romanogobio tenuicorpus — Amur whitefin gudgeon 
 Rutilus (Roaches)
 Rutilus caspicus — Vobla, Caspian roach
 Rutilus frisii — vyrezub, Black Sea roach, kutum
 Rutilus kutum — Caspian kutum
 Rutilus rutilus — Common roach
 Sarcocheilichthys
 Sarcocheilichthys czerskii — Cherskii's thicklip gudgeon 
 Sarcocheilichthys sinensis — Chinese lake gudgeon 
 Sarcocheilichthys soldatovi — Soldatov's thicklip gudgeon 
 Saurogobio
 Saurogobio dabryi — Chinese lizard gudgeon 
 Scardinius (Rudds)
 Scardinius erythrophthalmus — Common Rudd
 Squalidus
 Squalidus chankaensis — Khanka gudgeon 
 Squaliobarbus
 Squaliobarbus curriculus — Barbel chub 
 Squalius (European chubs)
 Squalius aphipsi — Aphips chub 
 Squalius cephalus — European chub
 Tinca
 Tinca tinca — Tench
 Tribolodon
 Tribolodon brandtii — Pacific redfin 
 Tribolodon hakonensis — Big-scaled redfin 
 Tribolodon sachalinensis 
 Vimba
 Vimba vimba — Vimba bream
 Xenocypris
 Xenocypris argentea —

Catostomidae (Suckers) 
 Catostomus
 Catostomus catostomus — Longnose sucker 
 Ictiobus (Buffalo fish)
 Ictiobus bubalus — Smallmouth buffalo; North American species, acclimatized 
 Ictiobus cyprinellus — Bigmouth buffalo; North American species, acclimatized 
 Ictiobus niger — Black buffalo; North American species, acclimatized

Nemacheilidae (Stone loaches) 
 Barbatula
 Barbatula barbatula — Stone loach
 Barbatula toni 
 Lefua
 Lefua costata — Eightbarbel loach 
 Oxynoemacheilus
 Oxynoemacheilus merga — Krynicki's loach

Cobitidae (True loaches) 
 Cobitis (Typical spiny loaches)
 Cobitis choii — Choi's spiny loach 
 Cobitis lutheri — Luther's spiny loach 
 Cobitis melanoleuca 
 Cobitis rossomeridionalis 
 Cobitis taenia — Spined loach
 Misgurnus (Weatherfishes, weather loaches)
 Misgurnus anguillicaudatus — Pond loach 
 Misgurnus fossilis — Weatherfish 
 Sabanejewia (Golden loaches)
 Sabanejewia aurata — Golden spined loach 
 Sabanejewia caucasica — Ciscaucasian spined loach

Botiidae 
 Parabotia
 Parabotia mantschurica — Manchurian spiny loach

Siluriformes

Siluridae 
 Silurus
 Silurus asotus — Amur catfish
 Silurus glanis — Wels catfish
 Silurus soldatovi — Soldatov's catfish

Bagridae (Naked catfishes, bagrid catfishes) 
 Leiocassis
 Leiocassis brashnikowi 
 Leiocassis herzensteini 
 Leiocassis ussuriensis 
 Mystus
 Mystus mica 
 Tachysurus
 Tachysurus fulvidraco — Yellowhead catfish, Korean bullhead

Ictaluridae 
 Ameiurus
 Ameiurus nebulosus — Brown bullhead; North American species, acclimatized
 Ictalurus
 Ictalurus punctatus — Channel catfish; North American species, acclimatized

Beloniformes

Adrianichthyidae (Ricefishes) 
 Oryzias
 Oryzias latipes — Japanese ricefish; acclimatized in Krasnodar Krai

Cyprinodontiformes

Poeciliidae 
 Gambusia (Mosquitofishes)
 Gambusia holbrooki — Eastern mosquitofish; acclimatized in Krasnodar Krai; some populations are reported from central Russia 
 Poecilia
 Poecilia reticulata — Guppy; self-replicating populations are reported from Moskva River and Volga River

Gadiformes

Lotidae (Rocklings) 
 Lota
 Lota lota — Burbot

Gasterosteiformes

Gasterosteidae (Sticklebacks) 
 Gasterosteus
 Gasterosteus aculeatus — Three-spined stickleback
 Pungitius
 Pungitius platygaster — Southern ninespined stickleback 
 Pungitius pungitius — Ninespined stickleback 
 Pungitius sinensis — Amur stickleback 
 Pungitius tymensis — Sakhalin stickleback

Syngnathiformes

Syngnathidae 
 Syngnathus (Seaweed pipefish)
 Syngnathus abaster — Black-striped pipefish

Perciformes

Percichthyidae (Temperate perches) 
 Siniperca
 Siniperca chuatsi — Mandarin fish, Chinese perch

Moronidae (Temperate basses) 
 Morone
 Morone saxatilis — Striped bass; North American species, acclimatized in Krasnodar Krai

Centrarchidae 
 Micropterus (Black basses)
 Micropterus salmoides — Largemouth black bass; North American species, acclimatized

Percidae 
 Gymnocephalus (Ruffes)
 Gymnocephalus acerina — Donets ruffe 
 Gymnocephalus cernua — Eurasian ruffe
 Perca (Perches)
 Perca fluviatilis — European perch
 Percarina
 Percarina demidoffi — Common percarina 
 Percarina maeotica — Azov percarina 
 Sander
 Sander lucioperca — Zander, pike-perch
 Sander volgensis — Volga pikeperch, Volga zander

Cichlidae (Cichlids) 
 Oreochromis
 Oreochromis mossambicus — Mozambique tilapia; African species, acclimatized in Krasnodar Krai

Odontobutidae (Freshwater sleepers) 
 Micropercops
 Micropercops cinctus 
 Perccottus
 Perccottus glenii — Chinese sleeper, Amur sleeper

Gobiidae (Gobies) 
 Acanthogobius
 Acanthogobius flavimanus — Yellowfin goby 
 Acanthogobius lactipes 
 Babka
 Babka gymnotrachelus — Racer goby 
 Benthophilus (Tadpole-gobies, pugolovkas)
 Benthophilus baeri — Baer pugolovka 
 Benthophilus casachicus 
 Benthophilus granulosus — Granular pugolovka 
 Benthophilus macrocephalus — Caspian tadpole goby 
 Benthophilus magistri — Azov tadpole goby 
 Benthophilus mahmudbejovi — Small-spine tadpole-goby 
 Benthophilus stellatus — Stellate tadpole-goby 
 Caspiosoma
 Caspiosoma caspium 
 Chaenogobius
 Chaenogobius annularis — Forktongue goby 
 Gymnogobius
 Gymnogobius castaneus — Biringo 
 Gymnogobius macrognathus 
 Gymnogobius taranetzi 
 Gymnogobius urotaenia 
 Hyrcanogobius
 Hyrcanogobius bergi — Volga dwarf goby; the smallest Russian fish 
 Knipowitschia
 Knipowitschia caucasica — Caucasian dwarf goby 
 Knipowitschia longecaudata — Longtail dwarf goby 
 Mesogobius
 Mesogobius batrachocephalus — Knout goby 
 Neogobius
 Neogobius fluviatilis — Monkey goby 
 Neogobius melanostomus — Round goby 
 Pomatoschistus
 Pomatoschistus marmoratus — Marbled goby 
 Ponticola
 Ponticola gorlap — Caspian bighead goby 
 Ponticola platyrostris — Flatsnout goby 
 Ponticola rhodioni — Riverine goby 
 Ponticola syrman — Syrman goby 
 Proterorhinus
 Proterorhinus marmoratus — Tubenose goby 
 Proterorhinus nasalis — Eastern tubenose goby 
 Proterorhinus semilunaris — Western tubenose goby 
 Rhinogobius
 Rhinogobius brunneus — Amur goby 
 Tridentiger (Tripletooth gobies)
 Tridentiger obscurus — Dusky tripletooth goby 
 Tridentiger trigonocephalus — Chameleon goby

Channidae (Snakeheads) 
 Channa
 Channa argus — Northern snakehead

Scorpaeniformes

Cottidae (Cottids) 
 Cottus
 Cottus amblystomopsis — Sakhalin sculpin 
 Cottus cognatus — Slimy sculpin 
 Cottus czerskii — Cherskii's sculpin 
 Cottus gobio — Bullhead 
 Cottus hangiongensis 
 Cottus poecilopus — Alpine bullhead 
 Cottus sibiricus — Siberian sculpin 
 Mesocottus
 Mesocottus haitej — Amur sculpin 
 Myoxocephalus
 Myoxocephalus quadricornis — Fourhorn sculpin

Cottocomephoridae (Bighead sculpins, Baikal sculpins) 
This entire family is mostly endemic to Russia, where it found in Lake Baikal and surrounding lakes and rivers.
 
 Batrachocottus
 Batrachocottus baicalensis — Bighead sculpin 
 Batrachocottus multiradiatus 
 Batrachocottus nikolskii — Fat sculpin 
 Batrachocottus talievi 
 Cottocomephorus
 Cottocomephorus alexandrae 
 Cottocomephorus grewingkii — Baikal yellowfin 
 Cottocomephorus inermis — Longfin Baikal sculpin 
 Leocottus
 Leocottus kesslerii — Kessler's sculpin 
 Paracottus
 Paracottus knerii — Stone sculpin

Comephoridae 
This entire family is endemic to Russia, Lake Baikal.

 Comephorus (Golomyankas, Baikal oilfish)
 Comephorus baicalensis — Big Baikal oilfish 
 Comephorus dybowski — Little Baikal oilfish

Abyssocottidae (Deep-water sculpins) 
This entire family is endemic to Russia, Lake Baikal.

 Abyssocottus
 Abyssocottus elochini 
 Abyssocottus gibbosus 
 Abyssocottus korotneffi 
 Asprocottus
 Asprocottus abyssalis 
 Asprocottus herzensteini — Herzenstein's rough sculpin 
 Asprocottus korjakovi 
 Asprocottus parmiferus 
 Asprocottus platycephalus
 Asprocottus pulcher  
 Cottinella
 Cottinella boulengeri — Short-headed sculpin 
 Cyphocottus
 Cyphocottus eurystomus 
 Cyphocottus megalops — Vitim sculpin 
 Limnocottus
 Limnocottus bergianus 
 Limnocottus godlewskii 
 Limnocottus griseus 
 Limnocottus pallidus 
 Neocottus
 Neocottus thermalis 
 Neocottus werestschagini
 Procottus
 Procottus gotoi 
 Procottus gurwici — Dwarf sculpin 
 Procottus jeittelesii — Red sculpin 
 Procottus major

References 
 База данных «Позвоночные животные России: Круглоротые и рыбы пресных вод России»

Russia
Russia
Fish
Russia
'Russia